Spalding United Football Club is a football club based in Spalding, Lincolnshire, England.

History
The club was established in 1905 when Fulney Institute and Victoria merged. Their first match was a 3–1 defeat at Stamford. The club joined the Peterborough & District League and were champions in 1930–31. They then stepped up to the Northamptonshire League, which became the United Counties League in 1934. Prior to World War 1 the club played under the banner of Spalding United having merged in 1905/06 with Fulney Institute following a failed merger with then arch rivals Spalding Town, prior to this the club was known as Spalding Victoria.

After World War II they won the Lincolnshire Senior B Cup in 1950–51 and the Senior A Cup in 1952–53. In 1954 they applied to join the Eastern Counties League, but were rejected after a vote. However, the following season they won the UCL for the first time, also winning the League Cup and were accepted into the ECL. In 1960 they switched to the Central Alliance, before joining the Midland League the following season. After finishing bottom in 1967–68 they returned to the UCL. During this period they twice reached the first round of the FA Cup, losing 3–1 at Durham City in 1957–58 and 5–3 at Newport County in 1964–65.

They won the UCL in 1974–75 and after several successive top-four finishes, rejoined the Midland League in 1978. They finished fourth in 1981–82, so were placed in the Premier Division of the Northern Counties East League when it was formed by a merger of the Midland League and the Yorkshire League in 1982. They won the first ever NCEL title with a 1–0 win on the final day of the season. After internal disputes within the NCEL related to the miners' strike, Spalding rejoined the UCL in 1986 and were champions in 1987–88, resulting in promotion to the Midland Division of the Southern League. After finishing bottom in 1990–91 they returned to the UCL.

After a narrow escape from liquidation in the early 1990s the club won the UCL Cup in 1994–95 and the Premier Division in 1998–99. They were promoted back to the Southern League, but again struggled. Despite finishing bottom in 2000–01 the club avoided relegation as other clubs resigned. However, they finished second from bottom in 2002–03 and were relegated again. After a fifth UCL title in 2003–04 they were promoted to Division One of the Northern Premier League. They were transferred to the Midland Division of the Southern League in 2006 but moved back to the NPL a year later to join Division One South. In 2009–10 they finished in the relegation places but avoided demotion due to clubs transferring between leagues. However, they finished bottom of the following season and were relegated back to the UCL.

The club started the 2013–14 season Premier Division season by winning seventeen games in a row, a league record. The run ended on 14 December 2013 when they lost at home to AFC Rushden & Diamonds. The club went on to win the league, earning promotion to First Division South of the Northern Premier League.

Ground
The club initially played on several different pitches in Clay Lake, Fulney, Love Lane and Black Swan Field, with the latter eventually becoming the club's permanent home ground. In 1954 it was renamed after Halley Stewart, a local MP. After World War II the club spent a season playing at a temporary ground in nearby Low Fulney. The record attendance of 6,972 was set in 1952 for an FA Cup qualifying match against Peterborough United.

Honours
Northern Counties East League
Premier Division champions 1982–83
United Counties League
Premier Division champions 1954–55, 1974–75, 1987–88, 1998–99, 2003–04, 2013–14
League Cup winners 1954–55, 1994–95
Peterborough & District League
Champions 1930–31
Lincolnshire Senior A Cup
Winners 1952–53
Lincolnshire Senior B Cup
Winners 1950–51

Club records
Best league performance: 6th in Southern League Midlands Division, 1989–90
Best FA Cup performance: First round proper, 1957–58, 1964–65
Best FA Trophy performance: Third round, 1999–2000
Best FA Vase performance: Quarter-finals, 1989–90, 1996–97

See also
Spalding United F.C. players
Spalding United F.C. managers

References

External links

 
Football clubs in England
Football clubs in Lincolnshire
Association football clubs established in 1905
United Counties League
Eastern Counties Football League
Northern Counties East Football League
Southern Football League clubs
Northern Premier League clubs
1905 establishments in England
Spalding, Lincolnshire